This is the discography of Bell X1.

Studio albums

Extended plays
 "The Perfect Height For Kicking" (EP). This four-track EP was released prior to the Irish release of Neither Am I, despite sharing its title with a lyric from the song "Rocky Took a Lover", found on their third album.
 A promo EP, also titled "The Perfect Height For Kicking" was released during the promotional campaign for the Flock album. This EP has a different track list, and features songs from the Flock album.

Singles
 "Pinball Machine" (Irish-only release)
 "Man on Mir" (Irish-only release) (IRL #30)
 "White Water Song" (UK #132) Hot Press Single of the Fortnight
 "Tongue" (UK #85)
 "Snakes and Snakes" (UK #99)
 "Alphabet Soup" (Aborted after the promo release)
 "Eve, the Apple of My Eye" (IRL #18, UK #65)
 "Next to You" (Radio-only release)
 "Bigger Than Me" (Irish-only release) (IRL #16)
 "Flame" (13 March 2006) (IRL #12, UK #65)
 "Bladhm" (Irish language version) (Irish-only release)
 "Rocky Took a Lover"  (28 August 2006) (IRL #18)
 "The Great Defector" (30 January 2009) (IRL #3)
 "The Ribs of a Broken Umbrella" (2009)
 "Velcro" (2011) (IRL #44)
 "The End is Nigh" (2013)

Other releases
 The band performed a medley cover version of Justin Timberlake's "Like I Love You" and Kylie Minogue's "Slow" on the charity album Even Better than the Real Thing Vol. 2
 They contributed to the 2009 charity album, Sparks n' Mind, released in aid of Aware, performing a cover version of the Bruce Springsteen song, "No Retreat, No Surrender".

References

Discographies of Irish artists
Rock music group discographies